Tyre Glasper (born April 14, 1987) is a former American football linebacker. He played college football at the North Carolina Agricultural and Technical State University and attended Martin Luther King High School in Detroit, Michigan.

Early years
Glasper played high school football for the Martin Luther King High School Crusaders. He was named first-team all-city, first-team all-metro and special mention all-state.

College career
Glasper played for the North Carolina A&T Aggies from 2006 to 2009. Glasper switched to defensive end while with the Aggies, and was twice named preseason All-Mid-Eastern Athletic Conference.

Professional career

Glasper was assigned to the Arizona Rattlers on September 23, 2010, to a two-year contract. Glasper had a solid rookie season recording 7.5 sacks. In just his second season, he helped the Rattlers capture an ArenaBowl XXV Championship. Glasper agreed to a two-year contract with the Rattlers on October 17, 2012. Glasper would continue to be a force on the defense for the Rattlers, helping them to two more ArenaBowl championships in 2013 & 2014.

He was selected by the Guangzhou Power of the China Arena Football League (CAFL) in the fourth round of the 2016 CAFL Draft. He earned All-Pro South Division All-Star honors in 2016. He is listed on the Power's roster for the 2018 season.

On May 1, 2017, Glasper was assigned to the Philadelphia Soul. On August 26, 2017, the Soul beat the Tampa Bay Storm in ArenaBowl XXX by a score of 44–40.

AFL statistics

Stats from ArenaFan:

References

External links

North Carolina A&T bio
Arena Football League bio
NFL Draft Scout

Living people
1987 births
Players of American football from Detroit
American football linebackers
North Carolina A&T Aggies football players
Arizona Rattlers players
Guangzhou Power players
Martin Luther King High School (Detroit) alumni
Philadelphia Soul players